Pholidocercus is an extinct monotypic genus of mammal from the Messel pit related to and resembling the modern-day hedgehog with a single species, Pholidocercus hassiacus. Like the hedgehog, it was covered in thin spines.  Unlike hedgehogs, it had scales on its head in a helmet-like formation, and had a long, thick, scaled tail.

External links
Mikko's Phylogeny Archive

Amphilemuridae
Prehistoric Eulipotyphla
Eocene mammals of Europe
Prehistoric monotypic mammal genera
Prehistoric placental genera
Fossils of Germany
Fossil taxa described in 1983